David Rutledge may refer to:

 David Rutledge (engineer) (born 1952), professor of engineering
 David E. Rutledge, member of the Michigan House of Representatives
 David Rutledge (racing driver)